Filip Špoljarec (born 1 May 1994) is a Croatian badminton player.

Achievements

Mediterranean Games 
Men's doubles

BWF International Challenge/Series (1 title, 2 runners-up)
Men's doubles

  BWF International Challenge tournament
  BWF International Series tournament
  BWF Future Series tournament

References

External links 
 

1994 births
Living people
Croatian male badminton players
Competitors at the 2022 Mediterranean Games
Mediterranean Games bronze medalists for Croatia
Mediterranean Games medalists in badminton